Awards of the German Freikorps were unofficial military awards displayed by various veteran organizations in Germany during the immediate aftermath of World War I.  Upon the assumption of the Nazi Party to power in 1933, nearly all Freikorps awards were prohibited for wear on Party, State, and Military uniforms.  Two notable exceptions were the Baltic Cross and Silesian Eagle.  All other Freikorps awards were declared obsolete with World War I service thereafter recognized by a single award, known as the Honour Cross.

List of veteran awards

Freikorps awards may be divided into two categories: veteran decorations recognized by the German government as well as paramilitary awards issued under the authority of local Freikorps commanders.

Veteran awards

 Anhalt Field Decoration
 Argonne Cross
 Artillery Cross (1st and 2nd Class)
 Baden Field Decoration
 Bavarian War Commemorative Cross
 Brunswick Field Decoration
 Champagne Cross
 Colonial War Veterans Badge
 Danzig Shield
 Eastern Front Cross
 Federal Decoration (1st and 2nd Class)
 Flanders Naval Corps Commemorative Cross
 Frankfurt Medal
 George Award (Cross & Medal)
 German Field Honour Cross
 German Front Soldier's Badge
 German World War Commemorative Medal
 Golden War Cross of Honour (with and without swords)
 Hanover War Commemorative Medal
 Keller Cross
 Kyffhauser War Commemorative Medal (with 97 possible campaign and service bars)
 Knight's Cross of the German Legion of Honour
 Langemarck Cross
 Mackensen Honour Cross (1st and 2nd Class)
 Maltese Cross
 Munich Front Cross
 Prisoner-of-War Commemorative Cross
 Prussian Knight's Cross of Honour (1st and 2nd Class)
 Saxon Knight's Cross of Honour (1st and 2nd Class) 
 Somme Cross
 Verdun Cross
 War Cross of Honour (with and without swords)
 War Volunteers Commemorative Cross
 World War Commemorative Cross (issued by the League of German Railwaymen)
 Wurttemberg War Commemorative Badge

Commemorative awards

 German Legion of Honor

In addition to the awards listed above, there existed hundreds of additional veteran badges, pins, and other pseudo-decorations issued on behalf of individual regiments and battalions.  The vast majority of these were considered unofficial commemorative medals and worn only at specific veteran events or reunions.  Another common practice of many regiments was to issue "regimental diplomas" which certified that a veteran had performed combat service in a regiment during the First World War.  The most famous of these types of certificates was the Regimental Diploma List which was presented to Adolf Hitler for his own World War I military service.

Paramilitary decorations

The following awards were issued by local Freikorps commands, and usually were only worn and displayed while serving as a member of the issuing command.

Freikorps awards

 Alten Loyalty Badge
 Annaberg Cross
 Awaloff Death's Head Cross
 Baltic Cross
 Bergerhoff Commemorative Badge
 Beuthen Cross of Honour
 Black Guard Cross of Loyalty
 Bremen Commemorative Medal
 Bug Star
 Danzig Decoration
 Diebitsch Cross
 Erhardt Brigade Decoration
 German Knight's Cross
 German Legion Commemorative Badge
 German Self Defense Division Medal
 Grodno Decoration
 Guard Cavalry Decoration
 Hindenburg Merit Medal
 Iron Division Medal
 Iron Flotilla Medal
 Iron Roland
 Kreuzburg Cross
 Kuhme Badge
 Kurland Medal
 Lautenbacher Merit Badge
 Lowenfeld Cross
 Lublinitz Cross
 Lutzow Cross
 May Decoration
 Munich Medal
 Northern Military Hospital Battalion Decoration
 Oberland Commemorative Decoration
 Pitschener Cross
 Silesian Cross, Eagle, Medal, and Shield
 Sudetenland Volunteer Regiment Decoration
 Teutonic Shield
 von Aulock Commemorative Badge
 von Epp Staff Company Commemorative Medal
 von Heydebreck Merit Badge
 von Oven Decoration
 von Pfeffer Merit Decoration
 Weickhmann Order
 Wolf Battalion Merit Badge

Freikorps Service Awards

Medal for Good Horse Care

References

Lumsden, R. (2001), Medals and Decorations of Hitler's Germany (Shrewsbury, MBI Publishing)

Freikorps
Military awards and decorations of Germany
Aftermath of World War I in Germany
Military awards and decorations of World War I